Two Mile Village is an Indian settlement in southeast Yukon, Canada. The settlement is recognized as a census subdivision by Statistics Canada.

Demographics 

In the 2011 Census, Statistics Canada originally reported that Two Mile Village had a population of 10 living in 5 dwellings, an -88.8% change from its 2006 population of 79. Statistics Canada subsequently amended the 2011 census results to a population of 79 living in 34 of its 37 total dwellings, a -10.2% change from 2006.

See also 
List of communities in Yukon

References 

Indian settlements in Yukon